Styx II is the second album by American band Styx, released in July 1973.

Background
After releasing their debut album, which consisted mostly of cover songs, the band intended to write some strong original new material; Dennis DeYoung was particularly in favor of this. DeYoung had written a song by himself on an electric piano in the band's garage, and had originally intended for it to be on the first album. He later decided to play it on an acoustic piano. However, Bill Traut wanted to save it for the second album. The result was "Lady", written about DeYoung's wife Suzanne.

"Lady" failed to be a hit when it was first released in 1973; however, after the band released their fourth album Man of Miracles in 1974, they went to WLS, the most powerful Chicago radio station at the time, and convinced the program director (Jim Smith) to replay this song. It wound up being played frequently on the air in Chicago. In May 1975, the song broke out nationally, eventually peaking at no. 6 on the Billboard charts.

Besides "Lady," the album contained some upbeat and prog rock songs, such as the rockers "You Need Love" and "I'm Gonna Make You Feel It," which were written by DeYoung and sung by James "JY" Young.

This is also the first album on which John Curulewski wrote and sang on two songs: the proggish, jazzy "A Day," which has an unusual sound for the band, and the boogie humor song "You Better Ask," whose outro features a snippet of "Strangers in the Night" on calliope organ and an evil laugh.

Side 2 opens with a DeYoung rendition of "Little Fugue in G" by Bach, played on pipe organ at a Chicago Cathedral, and segues into the mellow prog rocker "Father O.S.A." 

The rocker "Earl of Roseland" was written by DeYoung based on early memories from when he grew up in Chicago's Roseland neighborhood, where he had formed the band with the Panozzo brothers.

After Styx moved to A&M Records and achieved national success in the US, Styx II went Gold shortly before the success of The Grand Illusion (1977) and became the only big-selling album from the Wooden Nickel era, because of "Lady." The album was reissued in 1980 by their prior label, Wooden Nickel. Under the title Lady, the reissue had new artwork (though it is not to be confused with a Styx compilation album that was later released with the same name). Until the release of Crash of the Crown in 2021 it was the only Styx album to not feature material written or co-written by Young (apart from their covers 2005 album, Big Bang Theory).

Track listing

Personnel

Styx
 Dennis DeYoung – vocals, keyboards
 James "JY" Young – vocals, electric guitars
 John Curulewski – vocals, electric and acoustic guitars, synthesizers
 Chuck Panozzo – bass guitar
 John Panozzo – drums and percussion

Production
 Produced by John Ryan
 Executive producer: Bill Traut
 Engineers: Marty Feldman, Barry Mraz

Charts
In 1975, Billboard (United States) listed the album as #20 in the Pop Albums charts and the single "Lady" as #6 in the Pop Singles chart.

References

External links 
 Styx - Styx II (1972) album review by Lindsay Planer, credits & releases at AllMusic.com
 Styx - Styx II (1972) album releases & credits at Discogs.com
 Styx - Styx II (1972) album to be listened as stream at Spotify.com

1973 albums
Styx (band) albums